Polyestradiol phosphate/medroxyprogesterone acetate (PEP/MPA) is a combination of polyestradiol phosphate (PEP), an estrogen, and medroxyprogesterone acetate (MPA), a progestin, which was studied in the 1960s as a long-lasting combined injectable contraceptive for women but was never marketed. It was administered by intramuscular injection once every 3 months and contained 40 mg PEP and 150 mg MPA. The combination was studied in a sample of 99 premenopausal women and was found to be effective in preventing pregnancy, but caused menstrual irregularities similar to those of MPA alone as a progestogen-only injectable contraceptive. PEP was included in the formulation to prevent estrogen deficiency and reduce menstrual abnormalities caused by MPA during long-term contraceptive therapy.

See also
 Estradiol undecylate/norethisterone enanthate
 List of combined sex-hormonal preparations § Estrogens and progestogens

References

Abandoned drugs
Combined injectable contraceptives